Wang Bei (28 April 1931 - 1 March 2022), was a Chinese film actress.

Biography
Wang was born at Nanjing, Jiangsu, China.

In 1948, Wang graduated from Nanjing Normal School and joined the Shanghai Kunlun Film Company as an actress. She made her film debut in same year as the heroine Xiao Tao in the film, The Life of Wu Xun, and has since appeared on the screen.

Personal life
Wang's husband, Bai Hua, was a famous poet, playwright, novelist and essayist.

In 2008, Wang was diagnosed with Alzheimer's disease and lost her memories, only recognising her husband, Bai. Bai died in January 2019.

Wang died on 1 March 2022, at the age of 90.

Selected filmography
Crows and Sparrows (1949) as A-mei
The Life of Wu Xun  (1951) as Xiao Tao
The Mights of the People (1952)
Evergreen (1958)
Ordinary Business (1958) as Peiming Lin, new kindergarten teacher
Nie Er  (1959) as Wan Qianhong
The Magic Aster (1960) as Lan Xiao / Lan Da
The Knife-Thrower (1963)
Great Waves Purify the Sand (1966)

Awards
1957 – Ministry of Culture's 1949-1955 Outstanding Film Award for "Crows and Sparrows".
2007 – "Special Honor Award" by the China Film and Performing Arts Society.

References

External links
 
 Bei Wang

1931 births
2022 deaths
Actresses from Nanjing
Chinese film actresses